Saint-Nicéphore was a former municipality that has become a sector of Drummondville in the Centre-du-Québec region of Quebec, Canada, located east of Montreal on the Saint-François River. Saint-Nicéphore was once the seat of the Drummond Regional County Municipality.

On July 7, 2004, Saint-Nicéphore, Saint-Charles-de-Drummond and Saint-Joachim-de-Courval merged into Drummondville.

In 2004, its population was approximately 10,500.

References

Communities in Centre-du-Québec
Former municipalities in Quebec
Populated places disestablished in 2004
Drummondville